Sir Harry Stephen Meysey-Thompson, 1st Baronet (1809–1874) was Liberal Member of Parliament for Whitby between 1859 and 1865.

Thompson was well known as an agriculturalist who helped found the Yorkshire Agricultural Society in 1837, becoming its president in 1862, and was one of the founders of the Royal Agricultural Society in 1838. He served as High Sheriff of Yorkshire for 1856–57  and was also M.P. for Whitby from 1859, when he was elected in a by-election to 1865. In March 1874, shortly before his death, he was created the First Baronet Meysey-Thompson, of Kirby Hall, in the West Riding of the County of York. "Meysey" was Harry Thompson's grandmother's surname.

Thompson served the York and North Midland Railway until its amalgamation with several other railways in 1854, which created the North Eastern Railway (NER). He was then appointed to the first NER Board of Directors, which elected him to be the first Deputy Chairman; and in 1855, he was elected chairman of the board, in succession to James Pulleine. He remained chairman and director until his retirement in February 1874.

He married Elizabeth Anne Croft, and their children included: Henry (1845–1929, who succeeded to his father's title); Elizabeth Lucy, who married Walter Northcote, 2nd Earl of Iddesleigh; Albert (1848–1894); Charles (1849–1881); and Ernest (1859–1944) who became M.P. for Birmingham Handsworth from 1906 to 1922.

References

External links

Politics and poetry: a blog post for National Poetry Day 2012 - at The Victorian Commons

1809 births
1874 deaths
Baronets in the Baronetage of the United Kingdom
Liberal Party (UK) MPs for English constituencies
North Eastern Railway (UK) people
UK MPs 1859–1865
Place of birth missing
High Sheriffs of Yorkshire